Thomas Lote (fl. 1363) was an English politician and brewer.

He was a Member (MP) of the Parliament of England for Chippenham in 1363.

He may have been  related to the later MP for Chippenham, also named Thomas Lote.

References

Year of birth missing
Year of death missing
English MPs 1363
English brewers